Harry Clever Field  is a public airport three miles southeast of New Philadelphia, in Tuscarawas County, Ohio. The National Plan of Integrated Airport Systems for 2018 categorized it as a general aviation facility.

Lake Central DC-3s stopped at PHD 1953 to 1961.

Facilities
Harry Clever Field covers 160 acres (65 ha) at an elevation of 894 feet (272 m). It has two runways: 14/32 is 3,951 by 100 feet (1,204 x 30 m) asphalt; 11/29 is 1,907 by 70 feet (581 x 21 m) turf.

In the year ending May 31, 2011 the airport had 54,880 aircraft operations, average 150 per day: 97% general aviation, 3% air taxi, and <1% military. 36 aircraft were then based at the airport: 92% single-engine, 6% multi-engine, and 3% helicopter.

References

External links 
 Aerial image as of April 1994 from USGS The National Map
 

Airports in Ohio
Buildings and structures in Tuscarawas County, Ohio
Transportation in Tuscarawas County, Ohio